The Models  (previously known as Mongolia's Next Top Model) is a Mongolian reality television series, based on Tyra Banks' America's Next Top Model, which features a group of young women who compete for the title of Mongolia's Next Top Model and a chance to begin their career in the modeling industry. The series began to air on EduTV on January 15, 2017. After a two-year hiatus the show came back and has been renamed to "The Models" for season 3 and onwards.

Format 

Each season of Mongolia's Next Top Model has about 16-17 regular episodes, with a special recap episode which airs near the end of each season. Each season generally begins with about 16 contestants. Contestants are judged weekly on their overall appearance, participation in challenges, and their best photos from that week's photo shoot.

Each episode, one contestant is eliminated, though in rare cases a double elimination or non-elimination was given by consensus of the judging panel. Makeovers are given to contestants early in the season (usually after the first elimination) and a trip to an international destination is sometimes scheduled about two-thirds of the way through the season.

Differences from America's Next Top Model
In contrast the American version, the contestants receive instruction from a mentor who helps coach them in various aspects of the modelling industry and acts as a general assistant during photo shoots and challenges.

Cycles

References

Mongolian-language television shows
Edutainment TV original programming
Mongolia's Next Top Model